The Dyer Island Nature Reserve Complex is a protected area off the coast of Gansbaai in the Western Cape, South Africa. It consists of 3 islets, namely Dyer Island and Geyser Island, and Quoin Rock that lies 25 kilometres away off the coast of Quoin Point Nature Reserve and Agulhas National Park. 

Combined, Dyer Island and Geyser Island are a designated Ramsar site. 

It is home to a declining colony of African penguins ( individuals in 2015). Geyser Island is a smaller island nearby and is home to around 60,000 brown fur seals. 

The shallow channel between the two islands is popularly known as Shark Alley.

The reserve cannot be accessed by the general public.

History 

It is named after Samson Dyer, an emigrant from the US to the Cape Colony in 1806, who lived on the island collecting guano, which he sold to mainlanders as fertiliser.

In 1988, the two islands were named individually as Provincial Nature Reserves. And in 2019, the two islands were designated as a Ramsar site.

Biodiversity 

The reserve is home to a number of threatened species. It is home to 48 bird species, of which 21 species breed here. There are 26 species of fish found in the surrounding waters, including the endangered Galjoen.

Birds 

 African penguin
 African oystercatcher
 Antarctic tern
 Arctic tern
 Bank cormorant
 Cape cormorant
 Caspian tern
 Common tern
 Crowned cormorant
 Swift tern
 Hartlaub’s gull
 Leach’s storm petrel
 Roseate tern
 Sandwich tern
 White-breasted cormorant

Fish 

 Galjoen
 Great white shark

Mammals 

 Cape fur seal

References

Ramsar sites in South Africa